David Gervan McMillan (26 February 1904 – 20 February 1951) was a New Zealand politician of the Labour Party, and a medical practitioner.

Biography

McMillan was born in 1904 in New Plymouth, the eldest child of Annie Gertrude Pearce and David McMillan, a dairy farmer near Stratford. He received his secondary education at Stratford Technical High School, where he was dux. With the help of the Taranaki Scholarship, he could afford to study medicine at the University of Otago, from where he graduated MB ChB in 1929. He was a medical practitioner, first practising in Kurow (1929–34) and then at 115 Highgate in Kaikorai, Dunedin (c.1935-36, after which the building was his electorate office to 1943, then again a medical practice after he had left parliament). The building was demolished after 1950 to make way for the Stuart Street extension.

McMillan became involved with the Labour Party in 1923. In his view, good health extended beyond good medical support, but included educational, economic, and social factors.

He was Minister of Marine (1940–1941) in the First Labour Government, and was responsible for much of the social security system introduced by Labour.

In 1940 he ran for the position of Labour Party leader, being nominated by Arnold Nordmeyer, a friend from Kurow and a supporter of John A. Lee. Clyde Carr also ran, but the winner to replace Savage was his deputy, Peter Fraser.

He was a Dunedin City Councillor for 1935–1938, 1938–1941, 1944–1947 and 1950–1951. He twice unsuccessfully stood for the Dunedin mayoralty; he was beaten by Andrew Allen and Donald Charles Cameron in 1941 and 1944, respectively.

McMillan died on 20 February 1951 at Dunedin from a heart disease. He was survived by his wife, Ethel McMillan, and their two sons.

Notes

References

Dunedin City Council, Mayor & Councillors

External links
 

|-

1904 births
1951 deaths
New Zealand Labour Party MPs
Members of the Cabinet of New Zealand
New Zealand MPs for Dunedin electorates
University of Otago alumni
Deputy mayors of places in New Zealand
Dunedin City Councillors
Members of the New Zealand House of Representatives
People from New Plymouth
New Zealand general practitioners
20th-century New Zealand politicians